Harold Melvin Triggs (December 25, 1900 – July, 1984) was an American composer and pianist.

A native of Denver, where his father directed a company which sold musical instruments, Triggs studied at the Bush Conservatory under Julie Rivé-King, and also had lessons with Josef Lhévinne. He had a long career as a teacher, beginning at his alma mater and continuing at the Juilliard School and Columbia University. Concurrently he appeared as a concert pianist, both alone and as a duo with Vera Brodsky. Most of his music is for piano; other works include the orchestral The Bright Land, which was taken up by Leopold Stokowski and Howard Hanson among others, and recorded by the latter. As a pianist Triggs made a number of piano rolls during his career.

Triggs died in Thomasville, Georgia. His papers are held by Columbia University.

References

External links 

 Finding aid to Harold Triggs papers at Columbia University. Rare Book & Manuscript Library.

1900 births
1984 deaths
Musicians from Denver
Juilliard School faculty
Columbia University faculty
American male classical composers
American classical composers
American classical pianists
Male classical pianists
American male pianists
20th-century classical composers
20th-century classical pianists
20th-century American pianists
20th-century American composers
20th-century American male musicians